HD 172044 is a triple star system in the northern constellation of Lyra. It has a blue-white hue and is visible to the naked eye with an apparent visual magnitude of 5.41. The distance to the primary component is approximately 535 light years based on parallax.

The dual nature of the primary star, component A, was announced in 1973 by H. A. Abt and M. A. Snowden. The visible component is a B-type bright giant with a stellar classification of B8IIpHgMn, where the suffix notation indicates it is a chemically peculiar mercury-manganese star.

Component B is a magnitude 9.40 companion of an unknown spectral type. It was first reported by F. G. W. Struve in 1830. As of 2016, it has an angular separation of  along a position angle of 204° from the brighter component.

References

External links
 alcyone software - star data pages 

B-type bright giants
Spectroscopic binaries
Triple stars
Lyra (constellation)
Durchmusterung objects
172044
091235
6997